Bruce Williams may refer to:

 Bruce Williams (footballer) (born 1939), Australian rules footballer
 Bruce Williams (Royal Navy officer), Commodore in the Royal Navy
Bruce H. Williams (died 1916), state legislator in South Carolina
 Bruce Williams (talk radio host) (1932–2019), American businessman and radio talk show host
 Bruce A. Williams (born 1955), American political scientist and media studies scholar
 Bruce Williams (vice-chancellor) (1919–2010), Australian academic
 Bruce MacGillivray Williams (died 2005), former Canadian ambassador to Burkina Faso, Ghana, Turkey, Yugoslavia, India
 Bruce Williams, member of the World Saxophone Quartet

See also
Williams and Ree, comedy duo composed of Bruce Williams and Terry Ree
Bruce Williams Zaccagnino, creator of model railroad layout and museum Northlandz